Framework Convention for the Protection of the Marine Environment of the Caspian Sea is a regional convention signed by the official representatives of the five littoral Caspian states: Azerbaijan, Iran, Kazakhstan, Russian Federation and Turkmenistan in Tehran (Iran) on 4 November 2003. The Framework Convention, also called Tehran Convention, entered into force on 12 August 2006.

The objective of this convention is “the protection of the Caspian environment from all sources of pollution including the protection, preservation, restoration and sustainable and rational use of the biological resources of the Caspian Sea”.

In accordance with Articles 7 - 11 of the Convention the Parties undertake an obligation to take measures to prevent, reduce and control pollution from the land-based sources, seabed activities, vessels, as well as pollution from other human activities including land reclamation and associated coastal dredging and construction of dams.

Convention also provides for appropriate measures to prevent the introduction into the Caspian Sea and to control and combat invasive alien species, which threaten ecosystems, habitats or species.

The Parties also take preventive, preparedness and response measures to protect the environment and human beings from consequences of natural and man-made environmental emergencies, cooperate in setting up early warning systems and ensure the availability of adequate equipment and qualified personnel for combatting environmental emergencies. The Parties also agree to carry out environmental impact assessments of hazardous activities capable of causing environmental emergencies or adverse effects on environment within their jurisdiction,.

The Parties also undertake to ensure the protection, preservation, restoration and rational use of marine biological resources in the Caspian Sea; strive to maintain or restore populations of marine species at levels that can produce the maximum sustainable yield; prevent over-exploitation of marine resources and protect endemic, rare and endangered marine species and vulnerable ecosystems.

The 2003 Convention also provides for cooperation of the Parties in environmental monitoring, developing harmonised discharge and emission standards, conducting environmental research and development and exchanging environmental information.

A regularly convened Conference of the Parties and Secretariat were established by the Tehran Convention.

To date, the following four Protocols to the Framework Convention for the Protection of the Marine Environment of the Caspian Sea were drafted by Secretariat and discussed at the meetings of the Conference of the Parties:

Protocol on Land-Based Sources of Pollution
Protocol Concerning Regional Cooperation in Case of Emergency
Protocol on EIA in a Transboundary Context
Protocol on Protection of the Caspian Biodiversity.

The Protocol Concerning Regional Preparedness, Response and Co-operation in Combating Oil Pollution Incidents was adopted in Aktau, Kazakhstan on August 12, 2011.

The Protocol for the Protection of the Caspian Sea against Pollution from Land-based Sources and Activities was signed in Moscow, Russian Federation, on December 12, 2012 at the 4th Meeting of the Conference of the Parties to the Tehran Convention.

References 
.

External links
 The official text of the Framework Convention for the Protection of the Marine Environment of the Caspian Sea 
 Website of the Tehran Convention for the Protection of the Marine Environment of the Caspian Sea 

Environmental treaties
2003 in law
Water pollution in Russia
Environmental impact of shipping
Ocean pollution
Law of the sea treaties
Treaties entered into force in 2006
2006 in the environment
2003 in Iran
Treaties of Azerbaijan
Treaties of Iran
Treaties of Kazakhstan
Treaties of Russia
Treaties of Turkmenistan
Marine conservation